Jean-Loup Baer is a computer scientist and Professor Emeritus at the University of Washington.

Biography
Jean-Loup Baer received the Diplome d'Ingénieur in Electrical Engineering and the Doctorat 3e cycle in Computer Science from the University of Grenoble (France) and the Ph.D. from UCLA in 1968 under the supervision of Gerald Estrin.

Awards and honors

In 1997, the Association for Computing Machinery named him an ACM Fellow "for contributions to the design and evaluation of parallel processing systems, in particular in the areas of cache coherence protocols and techniques to tolerate memory latency".

References

External links
 University of Washington: Professor Emeritus, University of Washington homepage

Year of birth missing (living people)
Living people
University of Washington faculty
Fellows of the Association for Computing Machinery